Azat Malikuly Nurgaliyev (Azat Mälıkūly Nūrğaliev; born 30 June 1986) is a Kazakh professional footballer who last played for FC Tobol as a midfielder.

Career

Club
The pupil of the Shymkent football. The first professional club FC Ordabasy was his hometown. Later he moved to FC Tobol. In one of the seasons on Nurgaliyev claimed the champion of Kazakhstan FC Aktobe. In 2011, he returned to his native FC Ordabasy and that same year won with the Kazakhstan Cup team in 2011.

On 23 June 2016, Nurgaliyev joined FC Astana on loan for the remainder of the season, with a view to a permanent move.

On 17 January 2018, FC Tobol announced the signing of Nurgaliyev. Nurgaliyev, signed a new one-year contract with Tobol on 14 December 2018.

On 2 January 2022, Tobol announced that Nurgaliyev had left the club after his contract had expired.

International
Nurgaliyev has been representing the national team of Kazakhstan since 2009.

Career statistics

Club

International

Statistics accurate as of match played 1 September 2021

International goals
As of match played 7 June 2016. Kazakhstan score listed first, score column indicates score after each Nurgaliev goal.

References

External links

1986 births
Living people
Kazakhstani footballers
Kazakhstan international footballers
Association football midfielders
Kazakhstan Premier League players
FC Tobol players
FC Ordabasy players
FC Zhetysu players
FC Astana players
Kazakhstan youth international footballers
Kazakhstan under-21 international footballers
People from Shymkent